Vaushaun Brooks (born January 10, 1980), professionally known as Maestro is an American Grammy Award-winning hip hop record producer and songwriter. Maestro's trademark is a synthesized female voice saying "Maestro" at the beginning of his productions. Maestro's sound is primarily sample-free, relying heavily on synthesizers or live instruments. Brooks graduated with honors from Morehouse College in 2002.



Production credits

Daz Dillinger - Witit Witit
"Come Thru" (feat. Sky Keeton)

The Game - The R.E.D. Album
"Paramedics" (feat. Young Jeezy)

Mistah F.A.B. - I Found My Backpack 2: The Lost Notebook
"Yearbook"

Boo Rossini
"Whip It" (feat. Lil Wayne, Yo Gotti)

Aubrey O'Day feat Shanell
"Party All the Time"

Lil Wayne - Tha Carter III
 "3 Peat"
 "Prostitute 2"
 "Kush"

Ice Cube - Raw Footage
 "Gangsta Rap Made Me Do It"
 "Gangsta Rap Made Me Do It Remix" (featuring Scarface, Nas)

Too Short - Blow the Whistle
 "Call Her A B****" (produced with Playa Poncho)

Clipse - Clipse Presents: Re-Up Gang
 "Zen"
 "Celebrate" (feat. Joss Stone)

Dem Franchize Boyz - Our World, Our Way
 "Itz A Go"
 "Put U On"
 "Whip It" featuring Lil' Wayne
 "Aint No Stoppin"
 "Choosin" co-produced with Parlae
 "DFB" co-produced with Parlae
 "Numba 1 Girl" featuring J Que

Chilli - Bi-Polar
 "AWW!"
 "Take You Away"
 "Wanna Be Yours"

Dem Franchize Boyz - On Top Of Our Game
 05. "You Know What It Is"
 09. "Give Props"
 11. "Don't Play With Me" featuring Three 6 Mafia

Jibbs - Jibbs feat Jibbs
 13. "Stuntin" (Import Bonus Track)

David Banner - Certified
 04. "2 Fingers" featuring Jagged Edge (keyboards)
 06. "Fucking" featuring Jazze Pha (keyboards)
 09. "Certified" featuring Marcus (keyboards)
 12. "Westside" Produced by Maestro
 13. "I'll Take You Bitch" featuring Too Short, Bun B & Jazze Pha (keyboards)
 16. "X-ed" featuring Kamikaze (keyboards)

3LW - Point of No Return
 "Throwback"
 "Phone Sex"

[ Syndicato] - [ Syndicato]

 [ "305"]

Bishop Paul S. Morton - [ Seasons Change]

 [ Can You Come Today]

Big Gipp
 "Hell on the Charm"

Parlae
 "I Whip Yae" (Feat. Lil Wayne)

Tash - Control Freek
"Push The Button"

Lil Twist
"Old Enough (Remix)" (Feat. Nicki Minaj)

Mack Maine - Freestyle 102: No Pens No Pads
"Windows Half Down"

Yo Gotti - Cocaine Muzik 4.5
"Fishscale Dreams"

L.E.P. Bogus Boys - Don't Feed Tha Killaz 3
"DFK3 Intro" -  co-prod. by Team Green
"Darkness" -  co-prod by FMG

Jim Jones - Ghost of Rich Porter
"Oh Yeah Intro" - feat. Hell Rell
"Coke Rush"

Half Past Dead 2
 "Break Her Off" - featuring Kurupt

Next Day Air
 "Get It How You Live" - featuring 5 Grand co-prod. by Siah

xXx: State of the Union
 "Wyle Out" - featuring Bone Crusher
 "Just Like Wylin'" - featuring Three Days Grace

The Longest Yard
 "Talkin' That Talk" by Chamillionaire featuring David Banner (keyboards)

Occupation: Hollywood
"Side 2 Side" featuring D. Woods
"Tho It Up"
"I Like That"
"Good Times"
"Hoodstafied" featuring Kurupt
"A MO Girl Is.."
"One Night Stand"
"If Only"
"Train"
"I'm Sorry"
"Catchin' Feelings"
"Access Hollywood"
"Make My Move"

Midnight Club: Los Angeles
 "Gangsta Rap Made Me Do It"

Awards and nominations

References

External links 
 Maestro on Myspace
 [ Maestro] at AllMusic
 
 Maestro discography at Discogs

Hip hop record producers
Jamaican record producers
American hip hop record producers
American male composers
21st-century American composers
African-American songwriters
Songwriters from Connecticut
Living people
1980 births
21st-century American male musicians
21st-century African-American musicians
20th-century African-American people
American male songwriters